Keith Savage (19 September 1926 – 18 January 1979) was an Australian cricketer. He played in one first-class match for Queensland in 1950/51.

See also
 List of Queensland first-class cricketers

References

External links
 

1926 births
1979 deaths
Australian cricketers
Queensland cricketers
Cricketers from Brisbane